The Imbuing is the second full-length album by American metal band Gizmachi.  It was released in 2005 through Big Orange Clown Records, a subsidiary of Sanctuary Records. The album would garner the band a coveted slot on the 2005 trek of the summer tour, Ozzfest.

The track "The Answer" is featured in the 2006 video game Final Fight: Streetwise.

Track listing 
 The Answer (5:49)
 Wandering Eyes (5:05)
 Bloodwine (5:50)
 Burn (4:19)
 Romantic Devastation (4:58)
 Wearing Skin (5:07)
 People Show (6:54)
 Voice of Sanity (8:04)

Credits
 Sean Kane - vocals
 Mike Laurino - vocals, guitar
 Jason Hannon - lead guitar
 Kris Gilmore - bass
 Jimmie Hatcher  - drums
 Shawn Crahan - producer
 Josh Wilbur - mixing
 Howie Weinberg - mastering

References

2005 albums
Gizmachi albums